Jane Mandean is a paralympic athlete from South Africa competing mainly in category F37 throwing events.

Biography
Jane Mandean competed in the three Paralympics winning just one medal.  Her first games were in Atlanta in 1996 Summer Paralympics where she competed in the discus.  She then competed in Sydney in 2000 in the shot put and discus winning herself a bronze medal in the discus.  2004 in Athens proved less successful as she was unable to medal in the shot put, discus or javelin.

References

Paralympic athletes of South Africa
Athletes (track and field) at the 1996 Summer Paralympics
Athletes (track and field) at the 2000 Summer Paralympics
Athletes (track and field) at the 2004 Summer Paralympics
Paralympic bronze medalists for South Africa
Living people
Medalists at the 2000 Summer Paralympics
Year of birth missing (living people)
Paralympic medalists in athletics (track and field)
South African female discus throwers